Kasselaid is a  uninhabited Estonian islet in the Gulf of Riga. Administratively Kasselaid belongs to the Abruka village in Lääne-Saare Parish, Saare County.

See also
 List of islands of Estonia

References

Uninhabited islands of Estonia
Saaremaa Parish
Estonian islands in the Baltic